Teófilo Antonio Diek Andon (born December 13, 1987) is a Dominican judoka, who played for the half-heavyweight category. He won the bronze medal for the same division at the 2007 Pan American Games in Rio de Janeiro, Brazil.

Diek represented the Dominican Republic at the 2008 Summer Olympics in Beijing, where he competed for the men's half-heavyweight class (100 kg). He received a bye for the second preliminary match, before losing out by an automatic ippon to thirty-four-year-old Canadian judoka Keith Morgan.

References

External links

NBC 2008 Olympics profile

Dominican Republic male judoka
Living people
Olympic judoka of the Dominican Republic
Judoka at the 2008 Summer Olympics
1987 births
Pan American Games bronze medalists for the Dominican Republic
Pan American Games medalists in judo
Central American and Caribbean Games silver medalists for the Dominican Republic
Central American and Caribbean Games bronze medalists for the Dominican Republic
Competitors at the 2006 Central American and Caribbean Games
Judoka at the 2007 Pan American Games
Central American and Caribbean Games medalists in judo
Medalists at the 2007 Pan American Games
21st-century Dominican Republic people